Pocahontas County is the name of two counties in the United States:

 Pocahontas County, Iowa
 Pocahontas County, West Virginia